Atenulf ( or Atinolfo) is a masculine given name. It may refer to:
Atenulf I of Benevento (r. 899–910)
Atenulf II of Benevento (r. 910–40)
Atenulf III of Benevento (r. 933–43)
Atenulf I of Gaeta (r. 1045–1062)
Atenulf II of Gaeta (r. 1062–1064)
Atenulf (abbot of Montecassino) (r. 1011–1022)
Atenulf, brother of Pandulf III of Benevento (fl. 1040–42)
Atinolfo, bishop of Fiesole (1038–1057)

Germanic masculine given names